The group stage of the 1995–96 UEFA Champions League began on 13 September 1995 and ended on 6 December 1995. Eight teams qualified automatically for the group stage, while eight more qualified via a preliminary round. The 16 teams were divided into four groups of four, and the teams in each group played against each other on a home-and-away basis, meaning that each team played a total of six group matches. For each win, teams were awarded three points (the first time this was in place), with one point awarded for each draw. At the end of the group stage, the two teams in each group with the most points advanced to the quarter-finals.

Groups

Group A

Dynamo Kyiv initially beat Panathinaikos 1–0 on matchday one. This result was annulled when Dynamo Kyiv were expelled from the competition and Aalborg were allowed to play a replacement fixture.

Group B

Group C

Group D

References

External links
Group stage at UEFA.com

Group stage
UEFA Champions League group stages